Solidago hintoniorum is rare Mexican species of flowering plants in the family Asteraceae. It has been found in Nuevo León, Tamaulipas, and Coahuila in northeastern Mexico.

Solidago hintoniorum is a perennial herb up to 100 cm (40 inches) tall, spreading by means of underground rhizomes. Leaves are lance-shaped, up to 10 cm (4 inches) long. Flower heads are yellow, in elongated arrays at the tops of the stems.

References

External links
Photo of herbarium specimen collected in Nuevo León in 2003

hintoniorum
Flora of Northeastern Mexico
Plants described in 1989